is a village located in Nagano Prefecture, Japan. , the village had an estimated population of 9,689 in 3813 households, and a population density of 210 persons per km².

Geography
Matsukawa is located in northwestern Nagano Prefecture, in the Azumidaira plateau, bordered by the Hida Mountains to the north and west.

Surrounding municipalities
Nagano Prefecture
 Ōmachi
 Azumino
 Ikeda

Climate
The village has a climate characterized by characterized by hot and humid summers, and cold winters (Köppen climate classification Cfa).  The average annual temperature in Matsukawa is 10.1 °C. The average annual rainfall is 1278 mm with September as the wettest month. The temperatures are highest on average in August, at around 23.4 °C, and lowest in January, at around -2.4 °C.

Demographics
Per Japanese census data, the population of Matsukawa has recently plateaued after a long period of growth.

History
The area of present-day Matsukawa was part of ancient Shinano Province and was part of the territory controlled by Matsumoto Domain under the Tokugawa shogunate of the Edo period. The modern village of Matsukawa was established on April 1, 1889 by the establishment of the municipalities system.

Education
Matsukawa has one public elementary school and one public middle school operated by the village government. The village does not have a high school.

Transportation

Railway
 East Japan Railway Company – Ōito Line
  -  -

Highway

International relations
 – Lukang, Changhua, Taiwan, friendship city

References

External links
 
Official website 

 
Villages in Nagano Prefecture